Women Eco Artists Dialog (WEAD) is non-profit arts organization focused on environmental and social justice art by female identified artists and researchers.

History 
WEAD (originally called Women Environmental Artists Directory) was founded in 1996 by Jo Hanson, Estelle Akamine, and Susan Leibovitz Steinman as a printed reference directory for entities interested in finding artists working with environmental issues. Currently the directory takes form as a website with member-managed portfolios. The directory lists a wide variety of activist feminist artists, such as Agnes Denes; Mierle Ukeles; Betsy Damon; Jackie Brookner; Marina DeBris, a trashion artist; Betty Beaumont, often called a pioneer of environmental art; Judith Selby Lang; Robin Lasser; and Shai Zakai. 

WEAD has been listed among the best projects relating to environmental art, and has sponsored a number of exhibits about activist eco art. 

Co-founder Jo Hanson was instrumental in founding the San Francisco Recology Artist in Residence Program, located at the San Francisco dump. The WEAD co-founders were featured in a discussion about women artists of the American West whose art was about current social concerns.

Publications 
WEAD publishes an annual environmental and social justice magazine which focuses on such topics as dirty water and the legacy of atomic energy. Guest editors have included: Dr. Elizabeth Dougherty, founder of Wholly H2O, and speaker at events such as Pacific Gas and Electric Company conference on water conservation and Tuolumne County's conference on greywater; and Dr. Praba Pilar. Notable magazine contributors and featured artists include Mildred Howard and Linda Weintraub, the author of well known books on art and activism such as To Life!.

References

External links 
 Recology Artist Residency
Official Website

Arts organizations established in 1996
501(c)(3) organizations
Arts organizations based in the San Francisco Bay Area
Non-profit organizations based in San Francisco
Directories
Environmental art
Women artists
1996 establishments in California
History of women in California